Volodymyr Mykolayovych Bahmut (born 21 January 1962 in Dniprodzerzhynsk) is a Ukrainian professional football coach and a former player.

Currently, he is an assistant manager with FC Dnipro.

Honours
Top awards
 Soviet Top League champion: 1983, 1988.
 Soviet Cup winner: 1989.
 USSR Super Cup winner: 1989.
 USSR Federation Cup winner: 1986, 1989.
Minor awards
 Soviet Top League runner-up: 1987, 1989.
 Soviet Top League bronze: 1984, 1985.
 USSR Federation Cup finalist: 1990.
 Ukrainian Premier League runner-up: 1993.
 Ukrainian Premier League bronze: 1992, 1995, 1996.

European club competitions
With FC Dnipro Dnipropetrovsk.

 1986–87 UEFA Cup: 2 games.
 1988–89 UEFA Cup: 2 games.
 1989–90 European Cup: 6 games.
 1990–91 UEFA Cup: 2 games.

External links
 Career summary by KLISF
 

1962 births
Living people
People from Kamianske
Soviet footballers
Ukrainian footballers
Ukrainian football managers
FC Dnipro players
FC Torpedo Zaporizhzhia players
Soviet Top League players
Ukrainian Premier League players
Association football midfielders
Sportspeople from Dnipropetrovsk Oblast